Evans River, an open and trained youthful wave dominated, interbarrier estuary, is located in the Northern Rivers region of New South Wales, Australia.

Course and features
Evans River rises from Tucombil Canal near Woodburn, near South Evans Head and flows in a meandering course generally east, south, and then northeast before reaching its mouth at the Coral Sea of the South Pacific Ocean below Evans Head; descending  over its  course.

See also

 Rivers of New South Wales
 List of rivers of New South Wales (A–K)
 Rivers in Australia
 Athanassio Comino, an oyster lease holder on the river as early as 1882

References

External links
 

 

Rivers of New South Wales
Northern Rivers
Richmond Valley Council